Gianmarco Conti (born 1 February 1992) is an Italian professional footballer who plays for Gżira United.

Conti joined A.C. Milan in co-ownership deal for €200,000. In June 2009, few weeks before the bankruptcy of Venezia, Conti was sold outright for €50,000. In 2011, he was signed by Lecco in temporary deal.

Conti was signed by Serie D club Virtus Verona in October 2013. On 2 July 2014 he returned to professional football for Pordenone.

Footnotes

References

External links
 
 FIGC   
 

Italian footballers
Venezia F.C. players
A.C. Milan players
Alma Juventus Fano 1906 players
Calcio Lecco 1912 players
Bassano Virtus 55 S.T. players
Pordenone Calcio players
A.C. Monza players
U.S. Pergolettese 1932 players
Gżira United F.C. players
Maltese Premier League players
Italy youth international footballers
1992 births
Living people
Association football midfielders
Sportspeople from the Metropolitan City of Venice
People from Mirano
Footballers from Veneto